Juli Ashton (born October 5, 1969) is an American former pornographic actress.

Adult film career
In 1994, she moved to Florida and began appearing in adult films, starting with New Wave Hookers 4. From 1996 to 2006 she was co-host of the Playboy Channel's live phone-in program Night Calls. In addition to her film and television work, she has lobbied on behalf of the adult industry at the California State Legislature.

Ashton is the owner and operator of the adult website Juliland.com, a website that features the erotic imagery of photographer/director Richard Avery.

Awards
 1996 XRCO Award – Female Performer of the Year
 1997 AVN Award – Best Supporting Actress—Video (Head Trip)
 2000 NightMoves Award – Best Actress (Editor's Choice)
 2011 XRCO Hall of Fame
 2012 AVN Hall of Fame

References

External links

 
 
 
 Interview with rogreviews.com
 Interview at G4

1969 births
Actresses from Colorado Springs, Colorado
American female adult models
American female erotic dancers
American pornographic film actresses
American pornographers
Colorado State University alumni
Living people
Pornographic film actors from Colorado
21st-century American women